Spring Creek Colony may refer to:

 Spring Creek Colony, Montana
 Spring Creek Colony, South Dakota